Craster Tower is an 18th-century Georgian mansion incorporating a 14th-century pele tower situated near the fishing village of Craster, Northumberland, England. It is a Grade II* listed building.

History 
The Craster family have owned lands at Craster since about 1278. The substantial rectangular pele tower, originally of four storeys, is believed to date from the mid 14th century. It is referred to in a survey of 1415 as in the ownership of Edmund Crasestir.

The property was enlarged around 1666 when a two-storey manor house was built adjoining the east side of the Tower. A stable block (Grade II listed) was built to the north in 1724.

In 1769, George Craster erected an impressive five-bayed, three-storey Georgian mansion adjoining the south side of the Tower, which was reduced to three storeys and recastellated at this time. This may be by Newcastle architect William Newton.

In 1838, Thomas Wood Craster (High Sheriff of Northumberland in 1852) employed the architect John Dobson to improve and modernise the property.

The greater part of the estate was sold by Sir John Craster in 1965. The Tower was bought back by his son, Oswin Craster, and his cousins and was restored and converted into three separate residential apartments.

Buildings 
Craster Tower is rectangular. Only one of the tower's windows is believed to be of medieval date. The tower originally had four storeys, but this was reduced to three by George Craster's heightening the middle floor during the 18th century.

References

Other sources
Fry, Plantagenet Somerset, The David & Charles Book of Castles, David & Charles, 1980.

External links

 Craster History

Houses completed in 1666
Houses completed in 1724
Towers completed in the 14th century
Peel towers in Northumberland
Grade II* listed buildings in Northumberland
Country houses in Northumberland
1666 establishments in England